Jason Law (born 26 April 1999) is an English professional footballer who plays as a forward for League Two club Mansfield Town.

Career
A former Academy player at both Burton Albion and Derby County, Law joined Mansfield Town from local side Carlton Town in December 2015, having scored four goals in three first-team games for the "Millers". He appeared on the Mansfield first-team bench later in the 2015–16 season. He was regularly picked by Academy manager John Dempster as the "Stags" youth-team won the EFL Youth Alliance in the 2016–17 and 2017–18 campaigns. On 2 September 2016, Law was loaned to Sutton Coldfield Town. On 9 August 2017, he joined Gresley of the Northern Premier League Division One South on a six-month loan deal. He made his debut for the "Moatmen" three days later, away at Cleethorpes Town. He scored three goals in 26 appearances for Gresley. He made his first-team debut for Mansfield on 13 November, helping the club to record a 3–2 victory over Scunthorpe United in an EFL Trophy group stage game at Field Mill.

On 7 February 2018, Law joined Hednesford Town F.C. on a loan deal for one month. On 10 March 2019, the deal was extended until the end of the season. On 3 October 2019 Law joined Leek Town. In January 2020, he went on loan again, this time to Kettering Town F.C. for one month. The deal was later extended until 9 March.

Career statistics

References

1999 births
Living people
English footballers
Association football forwards
Burton Albion F.C. players
Derby County F.C. players
Carlton Town F.C. players
Mansfield Town F.C. players
Sutton Coldfield Town F.C. players
Gresley F.C. players
Hednesford Town F.C. players
Leek Town F.C. players
Kettering Town F.C. players
Northern Premier League players
English Football League players